Caveat may refer to 

Latin phrases:
 Caveat lector ("let the reader beware")
 Caveat emptor ("let the buyer beware")
 Caveat venditor ("let the seller beware")

Other:
 CAVEAT, a Canadian lobby group
 Caveat, an album by Nuclear Death
 Caveat (film), a 2020 horror film
 Caveat, a rural locality west of Mansfield, Australia
 Caveat (horse) (fl. 1983)
 Classified information in the United States#Handling caveats
 A moratorium on probate, especially in Common Law jurisdictions

See also 
 Paulette Caveat, attempt to enjoin development in northern Canada
 Patent caveat, former type patent-related action
National caveats, restrictions on military operations put in place by NATO member countries regarding the use of their military forces
 Reservation (law), a caveat to a state's acceptance of an international treaty